Otar Kiteishvili (born 26 March 1996) is a Georgian professional footballer who plays for Sturm Graz in the Austrian Bundesliga.

Club career

Dinamo Tbilisi
Kiteishvili began his career in Dinamo Tbilisi. In April 2014, he was sent on loan to League rivals Metalurgi Rustavi. He made his debut on 7 May in the eighth matchday of the Umaglesi Liga championship round against Sioni Bolnisi, netting his side's second goal after coming on as a substitute for Kakhaber Kakashvili in a 2–0 home win.

In the winter break of the 2014–15 season, he returned to Dinamo Tbilisi. After playing 14 games for Rustavi in the top Georgian league in the first half of the season, he played as many games for Dinamo after his return. Kiteishvili scored his first league goal for the club on 3 October 2015, which proved to be the match-winner in a 1–0 home win over Dinamo Batumi.

Kiteishvili made 98 league appearances for Dinamo Tbilisi, in which he scored 17 goals.

Sturm Graz
On 31 July 2018, Kiteishvili moved to Sturm Graz in the Austrian Football Bundesliga, where he signed a four-year contract. He made his debut on 12 August in the third matchday of the domestic league against SKN St. Pölten, coming on as a substitute in the 68th minute for Lukas Grozurek of a 2–0 away loss. On 2 December, Kiteishvili scored his first goal for Sturm Graz to secure the 3–0 final score in a victory against Wolfsberger AC.

International career
Kiteishvili made his debut for the Georgia national football team on 23 January 2017 in a friendly against Uzbekistan.

International goals 
Scores and results list Georgia's goal tally first.

|-
!scope=row|
| 9 June 2022 || Toše Proeski Arena, Skopje, North Macedonia ||  || align=center | 3–0 || align=center | 3–0 || 2022–23 UEFA Nations League C
|}

Honours
Dinamo Tbilisi
 Umaglesi Liga: 2015–16
 Georgian Cup: 2014–15, 2015–16
 Georgian Super Cup: 2015

References

External links

Living people
1996 births
People from Rustavi
Footballers from Georgia (country)
Georgia (country) under-21 international footballers
Georgia (country) youth international footballers
Georgia (country) international footballers
Association football midfielders
FC Dinamo Tbilisi players
FC Metalurgi Rustavi players
SK Sturm Graz players
Expatriate sportspeople from Georgia (country) in Austria
Expatriate footballers in Austria
Austrian Football Bundesliga players